Hava Mustafa (born 20 September 1997) is a Macedonian footballer who plays as a forward for 1. liga club ŽFK Shkëndija and the North Macedonia women's national team.

References

1997 births
Living people
Women's association football forwards
Macedonian women's footballers
North Macedonia women's international footballers
Albanian footballers from North Macedonia